Ascosiidae is a family of bryozoans belonging to the order Cheilostomatida.

Genera:
 Ascosia Jullien, 1882
 Bragella Di Martino, Taylor, Cotton & Pearson, 2017
 Fedora Jullien, 1882
 Kionidella Koschinsky, 1885
 Stenosipora Canu & Bassler, 1927

References

Bryozoan families